Fullerton is an unincorporated area and census-designated place (CDP) in Whitehall Township in Lehigh County, Pennsylvania. The population of Fullerton was 16,588 as of the 2020 census. Fullerton is a suburb of Allentown in the Lehigh Valley metropolitan area, which had a population of 861,899 and was the 68th most populous metropolitan area in the U.S. as of the 2020 census.

History

Originally known as "Ferndale", the town was located on tracts of land originally settled by Giles Windsor (1767), Stephen Snyder (1786) and Jacob Yundt (1826). In 1895, the town was renamed "Fullerton" in honor of local businessman James W. Fuller Jr., who had purchased the railroad car wheel factory of Frederick & Company in 1865 and operated it as McKee, Fuller & Co. and later the Lehigh Car, Wheel & Axle Works. Fuller laid out the hamlet in 1870, and by 1883 it was a thriving company town with a population in excess of 1,500 men and their families. When the Lehigh Valley cement industry exploded in the early 1900s, Fuller's company prospered by providing machinery to the mills in the region, and the town supplied the workforce for both his factories, and the numerous mills and quarries operating in the immediate area.

The Dent Hardware Company Factory Complex in Fullerton was listed on the National Register of Historic Places in 1986.

Geography
Fullerton is located in eastern Lehigh County at  (40.631297, -75.480215), in the southern part of Whitehall Township. It is bordered to the south by the city of Allentown and to the east by the Lehigh River. To the northeast, across the Lehigh River, is the borough of Catasauqua.

U.S. Route 22, the Lehigh Valley Thruway, runs through central Fullerton, with two interchanges in the community: one with Pennsylvania Route 145 (MacArthur Road) and the other with Fullerton Avenue/Third Street. US-22 leads east  to Easton and west with Interstate 78  to Harrisburg, the state capital. PA-145 leads south  to the center of Allentown and north  to Walnutport. The Lehigh Valley Mall is located in Fullerton on the northeastern side of the US-22/PA-145 interchange.

The community is drained by the Lehigh River and its tributary, Jordan Creek.

Demographics

As of the census of 2000, there were 14,268 people, 6,224 households, and 3,827 families residing in the CDP. The population density was 3,815.5 people per square mile (1,473.0/km). There were 6,484 housing units at an average density of 1,733.9/sq mi (669.4/km). The racial makeup of the CDP was 86.09% White, 3.88% African American, 0.16% Native American, 5.52% Asian, 0.07% Pacific Islander, 2.57% from other races, and 1.70% from two or more races. Hispanic or Latino of any race were 6.15% of the population.

Ancestries: German (28.3%), Italian (11.8%), Irish (10.8%), Arab (5.6%), Slovak (5.3%), English (5.0%).

There were 6,224 households, out of which 24.2% had children under the age of 18 living with them, 48.7% were married couples living together, 9.1% had a female householder with no husband present, and 38.5% were non-families. 31.7% of all households were made up of individuals, and 11.2% had someone living alone who was 65 years of age or older. The average household size was 2.27 and the average family size was 2.87.

In Fullerton, the population was spread out, with 19.6% under the age of 18, 8.2% from 18 to 24, 31.3% from 25 to 44, 21.9% from 45 to 64, and 19.0% who were 65 years of age or older. The median age was 39 years. For every 100 females, there were 92.3 males. For every 100 females age 18 and over, there were 89.0 males. The median income for a household in the CDP was $43,048, and the median income for a family was $50,147. Males had a median income of $40,305 versus $27,230 for females. The per capita income for the CDP was $22,164. About 4.6% of families and 7.3% of the population were below the poverty line, including 8.3% of those under age 18 and 6.3% of those age 65 or over.

Notable people
Evelyn Keppel, former All-American Girls Professional Baseball League baseball player
Dave Steckel, former college football player and coach
Albert C. Vaughn, former U.S. Representative

Public education
Fullerton is part of the Whitehall-Coplay School District. Students in grades nine through 12 attend Whitehall High School.

References

Notes

Census-designated places in Lehigh County, Pennsylvania
Census-designated places in Pennsylvania